Alan Malcolm Clarkson  (1936-2010), was a male swimmer who competed for England.

Swimming career
He represented England in the 440 yards freestyle at the 1958 British Empire and Commonwealth Games in Cardiff, Wales.

He was the manager for the 1970, 1974 and 1978 Commonwealth Games teams and in 2004 he was appointed an OBE and received a long service award from the British Olympic Association in 2007.

Personal life
He was educated at Nunthorpe Grammar School and was an accountant by trade. His was married to Pauline Musgrave.

References

1936 births
2010 deaths
English male swimmers
Officers of the Order of the British Empire
Swimmers at the 1958 British Empire and Commonwealth Games
Commonwealth Games competitors for England